Digital Rock Star is the fourth studio album by French-English recording artist Space Cowboy. It was released in the United States on 26 October 2009 by Cherrytree Records.

Singles
In April 2009, a new song by Space Cowboy and Chelsea Korka from the Paradiso Girls, entitled "Falling Down", leaked onto the Internet. The song, as announced in the intro, was produced by RedOne. The video, directed by Good Fellas, premiered soon afterwards. The song was also played in a scene of the 2009 Walt Disney Pictures film G-Force. The physical single was released on 15 May 2009.

The album's second single, "I Came 2 Party", a collaboration with the German band Cinema Bizarre, was released on 7 August 2009. The song is also included on the band's second studio album ToyZ and their debut US album, BANG!. On his work with the band, Space Cowboy stated: "It's a pretty awesome time for people experimenting; we just did a song with a band called Cinema Bizarre, who are from Germany. The song's very glam-rock but with a synth-pop style and we just shot the video for it in a German country house."

Track listing

Release history

References

2009 albums
Albums produced by RedOne
Interscope Records albums
Space Cowboy (musician) albums